Nora Méndez (born March 24, 1969) is a Salvadoran poet.

Biography
Born in San Salvador, Méndez studied sociology and communication at the University of El Salvador. She has been described as a "resistance poet", writing verse in response to the political situation in El Salvador. At one time a political prisoner, she later became active with ASTAC, the Salvadoran Association of Cultural Workers. Other themes of her work include domestic violence and the status of women in her country. Her work has appeared in several anthologies, beginning with Poets of the Resistance, published by the University of Michigan in 1996. Some of her poetry has been translated into German for publication online. Méndez has appeared at poetry festivals in her native country and in Nicaragua and Colombia, as well as elsewhere in Latin America and in Europe. She has also performed as a singer, appearing with the group Nuevamérica, for whom she also wrote songs,  during the 1980s. Among her publications are the books Atravesarte a pie toda la vida (2002) and La Estación de los Pájaros (2004).

References

1969 births
Living people
Salvadoran poets
Salvadoran women poets
20th-century poets
20th-century Salvadoran women writers
21st-century poets
21st-century Salvadoran women writers
University of El Salvador alumni